Rosnaiella is a genus of Cambrian archaeocyaths known from Normandy (and elsewhere?).

Species
 †Rosnaiella brevis
 †Rosnaiella dangeardi F. Doré, 1969

References 

Prehistoric animal genera
Cambrian animals
Fossil taxa described in 1969